David George Mader III (born June 30, 1955) is an American professional stock car racing driver who competes part-time in the ARCA Menards Series, driving the No. 63 Chevrolet SS for Spraker Racing Enterprises. He is a former competitor in all three of NASCAR's national touring series and is also the winner of the 1978 Snowball Derby.

Racing career
Mader won the 1978 Snowball Derby, beating Mark Martin.

Mader competed in ten NASCAR Winston Cup Series races between 1988 and 1992, including leading seven laps at Martinsville Speedway in 1992. In the Busch Series, he raced in 22 events between 1986 and 1992, with nine Top 10 finishes. He raced in two Craftsman Truck Series events in 1998.

In his career, Dave has raced Southern All Star, Sunoco, ASA, NASCAR Late Model Stock, All Pro, NASCAR All - American Challenge, ARCA, NASCAR Craftsman Truck Series, Winston Cup, and Busch Series. Mader won four consecutive championships in the All-American Challenge Series between 1985 and 1988. He also builds and manufactures his own race cars, helps various race teams as their crew chief, and has taught at Race Car College. He has accumulated 224 feature wins. He also competed in the 1992 running of The Winston, driving the No. 9 car which was in the race as a winning team, thanks to Bill Elliott winning in 1991. 

In 2012, Mader was inducted into the Alabama Auto Racing Pioneers Hall of Fame.

ARCA Menards Series

Mader Finished Second in the ARCA Menards Series race at Talladega Superspeedway on April 24, 2021, his first top 5 finish in 30 years. Mader's last top 5 also came at Talladega, finishing second to Charlie Glotzbach. Mader has one career victory in ARCA, coming at Michigan in 1991.  After a 24-year absence from the series, Mader returned in 2018.

Personal life
Mader has five daughters, Tammy, Annette, Jennifer, Kelly, and Erica.

Motorsports career results

NASCAR
(key) (Bold – Pole position awarded by qualifying time. Italics – Pole position earned by points standings or practice time. * – Most laps led.)

Winston Cup Series

Daytona 500

Busch Series

Craftsman Truck Series

ARCA Menards Series
(key) (Bold – Pole position awarded by qualifying time. Italics – Pole position earned by points standings or practice time. * – Most laps led.)

ARCA Menards Series East

 Season still in progress

References

External links
 
 

Living people
1955 births
People from Shelby County, Alabama
Racing drivers from Alabama
NASCAR drivers
American Speed Association drivers
ARCA Menards Series drivers